Camilla Antoinette Clifford (29 June 1885 – 28 June 1971), known professionally as Camille Clifford, was a Belgian-born stage actress and the most famous model for the "Gibson Girl" illustrations. Her towering coiffure and hourglass figure defined the Gibson Girl style.

Early life
Clifford was born on 29 June 1885 in Antwerp, Belgium, to Reynold Clifford and Matilda Ottersen. Camille was raised in Sweden, Norway and Boston.

Career
In the early 1900s, she won $2,000 in a magazine contest sponsored by illustrator Charles Dana Gibson to find a living version of his Gibson Girl drawings: his ideal woman. Clifford became an actress, performing in the United States from 1902 and in England from 1904. She returned from London to Boston on 3 July 1906. While generally playing walk-on, non-speaking roles, Clifford became famous nonetheless: not for her talent, but for her beauty, and in the musical show The Catch of the Season which opened at London's Vaudeville Theatre on 9 Sept 1904 she sang a song, "Sylvia, the Gibson Girl". Her trademark style was a long, elegant gown wrapped around her tightly corseted, eighteen-inch wasp waist.

She retired from the stage upon her marriage in 1906. She made a brief return to the stage after the death of her first husband in 1914.

Personal life
In 1906, she was married to Captain the Hon. Henry Lyndhurst Bruce (1881–1914), the eldest son and heir apparent of Henry Bruce, 2nd Baron Aberdare. They had one child, Margaret, but the child died five days after birth. Her first husband was killed during the Great War in 1914 and his younger brother, Clarence, succeeded to the barony upon their father's death.

In 1917, she married Captain John Meredyth Jones Evans. After the war she left the stage for good and later owned a stable of successful racehorses. Together, they were the parents of:

 Capt. Robert Victor John Evans, who married Hon. Cicilie Carol Paget (1928–2013), a daughter of Almeric Paget, 1st Baron Queenborough and the former Edith Starr Miller, in 1926.

Her second husband died in 1957. She died on 28 June 1971.

Legacy

Despite her reputation as "the quintessential Gibson Girl", she was by no means the only person to pose for the popular character.

Photographs of her taken by Lizzie Caswall Smith in 1905 often appear in historical fashion books and on websites to illustrate the Edwardian style.

References

Further reading

External links

1885 births
1971 deaths
Belgian artists' models
Belgian stage actresses
20th-century Belgian actresses
Belgian expatriates in the United States
Belgian expatriates in the United Kingdom
Belgian expatriates in Norway
Belgian expatriates in Sweden